Behind the Bridge to Elephunk is the first video album by American group the Black Eyed Peas. It was released outside North America on May 26, 2004, by A&M Records, Interscope Records and will.i.am Music Group. The album includes music videos for singles from the group's first three studio albums–Behind the Front (1998), Bridging the Gap (2000) and Elephunk (2003)–alongside live performances and behind-the-scenes footage.

Release
Behind the Bridge to Elephunk was released outside North America on May 26, 2004, by Polydor Records. The DVD included a "Jukebox" feature, which allows the music videos to be played in a random order non-stop. It included the previously unreleased music video for "The Boogie That Be", which was filmed before the song was recorded and before Fergie joined the group. Most of the DVD's content was made available for streaming to members of the group's fan club Peabody.

Track listing

Personnel
Credits are adapted from the liner notes of Behind the Bridge to Elephunk.
 Brian Beletic – direction (tracks 5, 6, 9–13)
 Bill Boyd – production (track 4)
 Randi Feinberg – production (tracks 2 and 3)
 Terry Heller – production (track 7)
 Joseph Kahn – direction (track 8)
 The Malloys – direction (track 3)
 Anthony Mandler – direction (track 7)
 Louis Nader – production (track 10)
 Lanette Phillips – executive production (track 8)
 Fatima Robinson – direction (track 2)
 Betina Schneider – production (tracks 9 and 11)
 Joel Tabbush – production (tracks 5 and 6)
 Greg Tharp – production (track 8)
 will.i.am – direction (track 4)

Charts

Certifications

Release history

References

External links
 Official website
 

2004 video albums
Music video compilation albums
2004 compilation albums
The Black Eyed Peas video albums